The Church of St. Nicholas is a late 11th or early 12th century Pre-Romanesque style Roman Catholic church located in the field of Prahulje, one mile from Zadar, between Zaton and Nin in Croatia. It was built on the earthen pyramid mound on top of the Liburnian prehistoric tomb. 

The church is the only surviving example of early Romanesque architecture in all of Dalmatia. It is dedicated to Saint Nicholas.

Description

The Church of St. Nicholas was built in form of a fortress. It has a trefoil plan with four branches arranged around a central circular core, three of which form the apse, and the fourth the input branch. Its dome-shaped vault is reinforced with circular-ribbed arches above which 8 small towers with battlement as a lookout were built in the 16th or 17th century during Hundred Years' Croatian–Ottoman War. Flanges that are resting on pilasters that are abutting onto the pylons between the apses are placed under the dome. Input branch is rectangular and roofed with a mezzanine leaning on squinch, while three other branches of semicircular conch are translated with semi calotte. The church was built of small stones and has a smooth outer surface. It has very small dimensions; length: 5.90m, width: 5.70m, height= 6m.

Visit of Priul in 1603
In 1603, Church of St. Nicholas was visited by Priul who found neatly kept Glagolitic registers of baptisms and marriages, as well as two Glagolitic missals. At the time of his visit, Brotherhood of the Holy Spirit with 28 members was active in the parish. Priul ordered brotherhood to write its rules that had to be approved by the local bishop.

Usage
Since the Church was constructed, Mass was celebrated in it on the feast of St. Nicholas on December 6. In recent times, Mass is celebrated on the day of Saint Mark on April 25.

See also 

Nin, Croatia
Architecture of Croatia
Church of St. Donatus
Church of the Holy Cross, Nin
Church of Holy Salvation, Cetina

References

External links
 

Churches in Croatia
12th-century establishments in Croatia
12th-century Roman Catholic church buildings in Croatia
Buildings and structures in Zadar County
Tourist attractions in Zadar County